In number theory, an Erdős–Nicolas number is a number that is not perfect, but that equals one of the partial sums of its divisors.
That is, a number  is Erdős–Nicolas number when there exists another number  such that

 

The first ten Erdős–Nicolas numbers are
24, 2016, 8190, 42336, 45864, 392448, 714240, 1571328, 61900800 and 91963648.
They are named after Paul Erdős and Jean-Louis Nicolas, who wrote about them in 1975.

See also
Descartes number, another type of almost-perfect numbers

References 

Integer sequences